Victor or Vic Rouse may refer to:

 Vic Rouse (footballer, born 1897) (died 1961), English footballer with Stoke and Port Vale
 Vic Rouse (footballer, born 1936), Wales international football player and Atlanta Chiefs coach
 Vic Rouse (basketball), member of 1962–63 Loyola Ramblers men's basketball team